Troy Lenard Sneed Jr. (December 14, 1967 – April 27, 2020) was an American gospel singer, songwriter, and musician.

Early life
Sneed was born on December 14, 1967, in Perry, Florida, and played football while in college at Florida A&M University. He had an injury on the field that put an end to his playing days. He would join the choir at the university, and after graduating he was a teacher at Jax Beach Elementary School in Jacksonville, Florida. Milton Biggham, with Savoy Records, asked him to come lead the Georgia Mass Choir, in Atlanta, Georgia, as an assistant music minister.

Music career
Sneed's music career began in 1999, with the release of Call Jesus on March 23, 1999, by Malaco Records, but this album would not chart. His subsequent album, Bless That Wonderful Name, was released by Savoy Records in 2001, yet this did not chart. The third album was released by his own record label imprint Emtro Gospel on February 22, 2005, A State of Worship, and it was his breakthrough release on Billboard magazine Gospel Albums chart at No. 22. He released, In His Presence, on October 10, 2006 by his label, which charted at No. 44 on the aforementioned chart. His fifth album, In Due Season, was released by his record label on August 25, 2009, however it was not successfully charted. The subsequent album, My Heart Says Yes, released on May 10, 2011 by Emtro Gospel, and this one would peak at No. 5 on the Gospel Albums chart. He released his seventh album on August 7, 2012, All Is Well, and this charted at No. 9 on the aforementioned chart.

Personal life
Sneed married Emily Frances Ianson on July 2, 1993, and together they resided in Jacksonville, Florida, with their children.

Death
Sneed died of complications from COVID-19 on April 27, 2020, during the COVID-19 pandemic in Florida.

Discography

References

1967 births
2020 deaths
African-American male songwriters
African-American Christians
Musicians from Atlanta
Musicians from Jacksonville, Florida
Songwriters from Florida
Songwriters from Georgia (U.S. state)
People from Perry, Florida
Players of American football from Florida
Florida A&M Rattlers football players
Singers from Georgia (U.S. state)
Singers from Florida
20th-century African-American male singers
Deaths from the COVID-19 pandemic in Florida
21st-century African-American male singers